A malfunction is a state in which something functions incorrectly or is obstructed from functioning at all.  

Some types of malfunctions are:
Malfunction (parachuting), malfunction of a parachute
Sexual malfunction, also called "sexual dysfunction"
See also dyspareunia
Wardrobe malfunction, a euphemism, or slang term, for accidental nudity in public
Malfunction Junction, an ill-functioning interchange
Firearm malfunction, the failure of a firearm to function as expected

See also
 Dysfunction (disambiguation)
 Malfunkshun, a grunge rock band